Mattauschia is an extinct genus of trematopid temnospondyls from the Late Carboniferous of the Czech Republic.

Taxonomy
The type species of Mattauschia, M. laticeps, was named Limnerpeton laticeps by Fritsch (1881) for a small post-metamorphic specimen from Late Carboniferous coal deposits in the Czech Republic. Milner and Sequeira (2003) synonymized it and the nominal species Limnerpeton macrolepis with Mordex calliprepes, interpreting them as representing growth stages of one trematopid species. Milner (2018) eventually recognized laticeps as distinct from the M. calliprepes holotype, so he erected Mattauschia for laticeps, which includes the lectotype specimen NMP M470/471 as well as the paralectotype NMP M639 and Limnerpeton macrolepis lectotype NMP M472.

See also

 Prehistoric amphibian
 List of prehistoric amphibians

References

Trematopids
Prehistoric amphibian genera
Carboniferous temnospondyls of Europe
Fossil taxa described in 2018